The 1944–45 Copa del Generalísimo was the 43rd staging of the Copa del Rey, the Spanish football cup competition.

The competition began on 31 December 1944 and concluded on 24 June 1945 with the final were Atlético de Bilbao won their 16th title.

First round

|}
Bye: Real Gijón, CD Castellón, Club Ferrol and Real Santander.

Round of 16

|}
 Tiebreaker

|}

Quarter-finals

|}
 Tiebreaker

|}

Semi-finals

|}

Final

|}

External links
 rsssf.com
 linguasport.com

Copa del Rey seasons
Copa del Rey